The Kincaid-Ausmus House is a historic mansion in Speedwell, Tennessee, U.S..

History
The house was built in 1851 for John Kincaid III. The Kincaids owned slaves, and the house was built with slave labor. During the American Civil War of 1861–1865, John Kincaid III served as a captain in the Confederate States Army; he later fled to St. Louis, Missouri.

The house was later acquired by Jordan Longmire, and became known as Longmire Place. Subsequent owners included William Ausmus and his son Frank, followed by the Welch family.

Architectural significance
The house was designed in the Federal architectural style. It has been listed on the National Register of Historic Places since June 18, 1975.

References

Houses on the National Register of Historic Places in Tennessee
Federal architecture in Tennessee
Houses completed in 1851
Buildings and structures in Claiborne County, Tennessee